Give the Devil His Due is a 1985 Czech fairytale film directed by Hynek Bočan. It is one of the most popular fairytale films in the Czech Republic. The original Czech title means "No joking around with devils".

Plot
Petr's father marries Dorota and dies soon afterwards. Dorota wants to get rid of Petr and uses her courtship to the Governor who has Petr arrested. Petr meets Count's daughters Angelína and Adélka during his escape attempt and falls in love with Angelína. Angelína isn't interested in poor Petr while Adélka falls in love with him and tries to help him. Petr is forced to join the army where he is bullied by the Corporal. Meanwhile an inexperienced chort Janek is sent to take Dorota to Hell. He accidentally takes Petr's grandmother. Lucipher is angry at Janek and sends him to correct his mistake. Janek accidentally joins the army and loses his supernatural powers when soldiers burn his wolf's tail. He meets Petr and befriends him. Petr decides to help Janek to get his powers back. He manages to get him a new Wolf's tail. They escape army and abduct Dorota and drag her to Hell.

Petr works in Hell and Lucipher eventually decides to release him and fulfill him three wishes. Petr's wishes are: a magic coat that produces golden ducats, a release of his grandmother and permission to take the Corporal to Hell. Lucipher agrees but also wants Janek to take the Governor along with the Corporal. The coat changes Petr's appearance and he gets attention when he gives money to all people who need. This helps him to lure the Governor and the Corporal to Janek who takes them to Hell.

The Count also decides to go ask for the money as his principality is broke. Petr agrees but only if the Count allows him to marry his daughter. Count agrees with the deal but Angelína doesn't like it as Petr looks like a beggar but Adélka recognises Petr and happily agrees. Petr then takes as many ducats as he needs, takes down the coat and it disappears. He goes to Duke's castle as an elegant gentleman to ask for his daughter's hand. When Angelina sees him she changes her mind and wants to marry him but Petr declines and states that he asked for Adélka's hand. Petr then marries Adélka and Angelína unknowingly marries Lucipher.

Cast 
 Ondřej Vetchý as Janek Vraník, a chort
 Vladimír Dlouhý as Petr Máchal
 Josef Kemr as Duke Josef Sličný
 Dana Bartůňková as Angelína
 Monika Pelcová as Adélka
 Petr Nárožný as Corporal
 Jana Dítětová as Anna Máchalová, Petr's grandmother
 Viktor Preiss as Governor
 Jaroslava Kretschmerová as Dorota Máchalová
 Karel Heřmánek as Lucipher

Production
The film is loosely based on Čertův švagr by Božena Němcová. Some aspects were inspired by Fanfan la Tulipe. Writing took place in a group of Marcela Pittermannová. Filming took place in caves near Česká Lípa, in Průhonice, in village Střehom, at Sloup Castle and Kost Castle.

Reception
Give the Devil His Due is considered one of the best Czech fairy tale films ever made. Users of Kinobox server gave the film 87% rating. It is the highest rated fairy tale film on the server. The film has also won many awards including the main award at Chicago International Children's Film Festival.

References

External links
 

1985 films
Czechoslovak fantasy films
1980s Czech-language films
Films based on works by Božena Němcová
Czech adventure films
Czech comedy films
Czech fantasy films
Films based on fairy tales